The Potong Pasir Single Member Constituency is a Single Member Constituency (SMC) in the central region of Singapore. The current Member of Parliament of the constituency is People's Action Party (PAP) Sitoh Yih Pin.

Member of Parliament

Electoral results

Elections in 1960s

Elections in 1970s

Elections in 1980s

Elections in 1990s

Elections in 2000s

Elections in 2010s

Elections in 2020s

References
2020 General Election's result
2011 General Election's result
2006 General Election's result
2001 General Election's result
1984 General Election's result
1980 General Election's result
1976 General Election's result
1972 General Election's result
1968 General Election's result

Singaporean electoral divisions
Geylang
Toa Payoh